"An Invitation to Lubberland" was a broadside ballad first printed in 1685. Many believe  that it inspired the hobo ballad which formed the basis of the song Big Rock Candy Mountain recorded in 1928 by Harry McClintock. Lubberland is the Swedish name for Cockaigne, land of plenty in medieval myth.

Lyrics
Sung to the tune of Billy and Molly or The Journey-man Shoemaker by Daniel Cooper.

Notes

References
Beinecke Rare Book & Manuscript Library at Yale
The Roxburghe Ballads
National Library of Australia Catalogue entry
Early English Books Online (pay site)

17th-century broadside ballads